James Alan Hetfield (born August 3, 1963) is an American musician. He is the lead vocalist, rhythm guitarist, co-founder and a main songwriter of heavy metal band Metallica. He is mainly known for his intricate rhythm playing, but occasionally performs lead guitar duties and solos, both live and in the studio. Hetfield co-founded Metallica in October 1981 after answering an advertisement by drummer Lars Ulrich in the Los Angeles newspaper The Recycler. Metallica has won nine Grammy Awards and released ten studio albums, three live albums, four extended plays and 24 singles. Hetfield is often regarded as one of the greatest heavy metal rhythm guitar players of all time.

In 2009, Hetfield was ranked at No. 8 in Joel McIver's book The 100 Greatest Metal Guitarists and No. 24 by Hit Parader on their list of the 100 Greatest Metal Vocalists of All Time. In Guitar World's poll, Hetfield was placed as the 19th greatest guitarist of all time, as well as being placed second (along with Metallica lead guitarist Kirk Hammett) in The 100 Greatest Metal Guitarists poll of the same magazine. Rolling Stone placed him as the 87th-greatest guitarist of all time.

Early life 
Hetfield was born on August 3, 1963, in Downey, California, the son of Cynthia Bassett (née Nourse), a light opera singer, and Virgil Lee Hetfield, a truck driver. He is of English, German, Irish, and Scottish descent. He has two older half-brothers from his mother's first marriage and one younger sister. His parents divorced in 1976 when Hetfield was 13. They were very strict Christian Scientists, and in accordance with their beliefs, they strongly disapproved of medicine or any other medical treatment and remained loyal to their faith, even as Cynthia was dying from cancer. This upbringing became the inspiration for many of Hetfield's lyrics during his career with Metallica, most notably in the songs "Dyers Eve" and "The God That Failed" from ...And Justice for All and Metallica respectively. Cynthia died of cancer in February 1980, when Hetfield was 16 years old. After the death of his mother, Hetfield went to live with his older half-brother David. Virgil died in late 1996, during Metallica's Load tour. Hetfield attended Downey High School for his freshman and sophomore years and graduated from Brea Olinda High School in 1981.

Hetfield was nine years old when he first began piano lessons, after which he took on his half-brother David's drums and finally, at the age of 14, he began to play guitar with Robert Okner. He was also in a few bands as a teenager one being Leather Charm, and another, Obsession. Hetfield identifies Aerosmith as having been his main musical influence as a child, and has said they were the reason he wanted to play guitar.

Career 

In the early days of the band, Metallica experimented with a few different vocal and guitar combinations, essentially creating a setup similar to that of British metal band Diamond Head, another major influence on Hetfield. Some of the options considered included adding another guitar player, having John Roads play lead guitar, as well as asking John Bush from Armored Saint (who later joined Anthrax) to sing for the band. The finalized line-up of the band became Hetfield (lead vocals and rhythm guitar), Lars Ulrich (drums), Dave Mustaine (lead guitar), and Ron McGovney (bass), who was soon replaced by Cliff Burton. Hetfield referred to their early sound as power metal. The term "thrash metal" was first used when Kerrang journalist Malcolm Dome described the Anthrax song "Metal Thrashing Mad" in an issue of Kerrang in February 1984.

From 1982 to 1983, Mustaine's overly aggressive behavior and drinking problems led to mounting tensions between himself and Hetfield. Mustaine also once poured beer onto McGovney's bass, nearly causing serious damage. On April 1, 1983, the band recruited lead guitarist Kirk Hammett from the band Exodus, and 10 days later, Hetfield and Ulrich officially fired Mustaine from the band due to his erratic indifference. Mustaine was sent home on a four-day bus journey from New York to Los Angeles, and went on to form the heavy metal band Megadeth.

Since the recording of Load, Hammett has been recording rhythm guitars as well. Hetfield occasionally plays guitar solos on songs such as "Nothing Else Matters", "My Friend of Misery", "Just a Bullet Away", the outro solo on "The Outlaw Torn", the second solo on "To Live Is to Die", the first solo on "Suicide and Redemption", the first interlude solo on "Master of Puppets", and the harmonized solo on "Orion". He also writes the majority of the guitar harmonies, as well as writing the lyrics, vocal melodies, and co-arranging the songs with Ulrich.

Hetfield has been involved in a number of onstage accidents, most notable for being an incident with pyrotechnics at Olympic Stadium in Montreal during the Guns N' Roses/Metallica Stadium Tour on August 8, 1992. Hetfield was the victim of a pyrotechnics accident during the song "Fade to Black", in which a pyrotechnic charge reacted. Hetfield's guitar protected him from the full force of the blast; however, the reaction struck his left side, burning his hand, arm, eyebrows, face and hair. He suffered second and third-degree burns, but was back on stage 17 days later, although his guitar duties were delegated to former guitar tech and Metal Church guitarist John Marshall for four weeks while he made a full recovery.

Hetfield also suffered a broken arm a number of times while skateboarding, which prevented him from playing guitar on stage, and subsequently caused Hetfield's management company, Q Prime, to put a clause in Hetfield's contract forbidding him to ride a skateboard while Metallica was touring. During a live performance on tour for Metallica, Hetfield experienced complications with his vocals after performing a cover of the Anti-Nowhere League song "So What?", forcing him to take vocal lessons for the first time. He did basic warm-up exercises to piano keys with his vocal coach, who also gave him a cassette tape of the piano warm-up for future use. Hetfield still uses the same cassette he was given in the early 1990s to this day before any live performance or any recording Metallica does. Hetfield talks about his vocal training endeavors in the Metallica documentary film, Metallica: Some Kind of Monster, produced and directed by Joe Berlinger and Bruce Sinofsky.

During the recording of the band's eighth studio album St. Anger in 2001, Hetfield went into rehab to address his alcohol usage. He rejoined the band after seven months in rehab and four months recovering with his family. His health problems are featured in Some Kind of Monster. Some Kind of Monster also shows the making of the St. Anger album, and documents the various conflicts and issues the band were facing at the time including the departure of Jason Newsted, alcoholism, family commitments, and the future of the band.

Hetfield and Metallica addressed their need for a new bassist by recruiting Robert Trujillo, who formerly served under the wing of Ozzy Osbourne. Osbourne recruited Jason Newsted shortly after Trujillo's transfer. The new line-up has continued to make music and tour worldwide. Metallica's ninth studio album, Death Magnetic, was released on September 12, 2008. Like St. Anger and every album of original material released by Metallica since 1991's Metallica, Death Magnetic went to #1 on the Billboard charts in over 30 countries during its first week of release.

On April 4, 2009, Hetfield, along with remaining Metallica members Ulrich, Hammett, Trujillo, as well as former bassist Newsted, and the deceased Cliff Burton (who was represented by his father), were inducted into the Rock and Roll Hall of Fame. In an interview after their nomination, Hetfield commented that everyone who had appeared on an album with the band would be inducted. This excluded original guitarist Dave Mustaine and original bassist Ron McGovney, as both had appeared only on the band's early demo tapes. Hetfield and the rest of Metallica, including Newsted, performed "Master of Puppets" and "Enter Sandman" to end the ceremony.

Playing style 
Hetfield has been called "The King of Downpicking" for his right-hand picking speed by Annihilator guitarist Jeff Waters. He has explained he holds the pick with his thumb, index and middle fingers, rather than just the thumb and index, citing additional stability he gains by it.

Personal life 

Hetfield married Francesca Tomasi on August 17, 1997, and together they have three children. He currently resides in Vail, Colorado, citing a "multitude of reasons" for moving there, including it being his wife's childhood hometown, the natural beauty, and the quiet environment. During an interview on NPR's Fresh Air, Hetfield stated that his wife had helped him to mature and learn to deal with his anger issues more constructively, explaining that after they met, his destructive tendencies embarrassed both of them. Hetfield filed for divorce in August 2022 citing irreconcilable differences.

Hetfield's son Castor is also a musician, playing for the Savannah, Georgia-based band Bastardane as their drummer.

Hetfield has long struggled with addiction problems. In 2001, he entered a rehab program (documented in the film Metallica: Some Kind of Monster), and began maintaining total abstinence from alcohol. In a 2010 interview with So What!, the official magazine of Metallica's fan club, Hetfield stated that he is a "reborn straight edge". However, in 2019, Hetfield once again entered rehab, forcing Metallica to cancel their Australia/New Zealand leg of the WorldWired Tour. Hetfield made his first public appearance since leaving rehab at the Petersen Automotive Museum reception on January 30, 2020.

Hetfield enjoys a variety of activities, most notably hunting; farming and beekeeping; customizing cars and motorcycles in his garage; watching the Las Vegas Raiders, the San Francisco Giants, and the San Jose Sharks; and going to hot rod shows. He put his 1968 Chevrolet Camaro up for sale on eBay, with the proceeds going to a Music for Schools program. The car was used in the video for "I Disappear" and was given to him as a gift upon the video's completion. "Slowburn", his 1936 Auburn boat tail speedster, won the 2010 Goodguys West Coast Custom of the Year.

Hetfield has a number of tattoos, including one which shows flames encasing four playing cards ace (1), 9, 6, and 3 representing the year of his birth, and the words "Carpe Diem" ("seize the day"). The flames on the tattoo are in reference to the pyrotechnic accident which he suffered in 1992 during a concert in Montreal. He has tattooed an "M" and "81" on his right hand for "Metallica" and the year Metallica was founded, 1981, and an "F" on his left hand for "Francesca". He also has some Christian tattoos, including crosses and one of Jesus on his right arm. He has a tattoo of two razors forming the straight edge X symbol on his left wrist.

The first single Hetfield ever bought was "Sweet Home Alabama" by Lynyrd Skynyrd. He was featured in a documentary called Absent, directed by Justin Hunt, which takes a look at the effects of absent fathers on their children and the "father wound" that they leave behind.

Hetfield has expressed his disdain for politics and celebrities who "soapbox their opinions", stating that "for us, people are people you should all have your own opinion". In 2007, Metallica performed at London's Live Earth concert. When Hetfield was asked for his thoughts on climate change, he responded by saying:

In 2008, he made comments which were perceived as endorsing the use of his music at Guantánamo Bay to torture prisoners. British band Chumbawamba subsequently released a song called "Torturing James Hetfield" as a direct response.

Equipment

Guitars 
Hetfield has been a major endorser of ESP Guitars since the 1980s, and is best known for playing custom-made Explorer-style guitars with an EMG 81/EMG 60 set for pickups and since then he has his own signature EMG JH pickups. Hetfield's main guitar from the early days was a Flying V copy made in Japan by Electra, which was modified with a Seymour Duncan Invader (SH-8) pickup and used almost exclusively until 1984 when he switched to the Gibson Explorer model.

During the mid-1990s, ESP produced the first of his signature model guitars. To date, Hetfield has had six signature guitars with the company. However, Hetfield often uses guitars from Gibson and other companies instead of ESP despite his endorsement.

Some of Hetfield's guitars over the years have included:

Amplifiers and cabinets 
Throughout Metallica's career, Hetfield has used a wide range of different amplifiers. For the first two albums, he used Marshall heads and cabinets, with occasional effects. The specific Marshall that he used for Kill 'Em All was stolen after a concert prior to the recording of Ride the Lightning; Hetfield was extremely upset by the theft, as his mother had helped him purchase the amplifier before her death. In 1985, for the recording of Master of Puppets, he and Kirk Hammett each bought a Mesa/Boogie Mark IIC+ amplifier (the preamp sections of which were connected to Marshall power amplifiers), and since then he has mostly used Mesa/Boogies, including the Triaxis and Rectifier models. Around the time of St. Anger, Hetfield began using the Diezel VH4 head. The majority of his clean tones come from a Roland JC-120 Jazz Chorus Guitar Amplifier, although many different amplifiers have been used over the years.

In December 2011, it was announced by Fortin Amps that they would team up with Randall Amplifiers to start a new line of tube amplifiers based on the Fortin Meathead amplifier. Kirk Hammett currently has two prototypes, and Hetfield will eventually be receiving one.

The amplifiers currently used on tour by Hetfield are:
 Mesa/Boogie TriAxis preamp (x4)
 Mesa/Boogie Simul-Class 2:90 power amp (x2)
 Mesa/Boogie Triple Rectifier heads
 Diezel VH4 heads
 Mesa/Boogie 4x12 cabinets with Celestion V30 speakers in isolation cabinets
 Roland JC-120 combo amplifiers

Effects 
To avoid problems with pedals being damaged during live performances, Hetfield keeps his effect pedals in a rack along with his amplifiers and his guitar technician controls them through a pedalboard sidestage. The pedal controller allows him to change between different effect pedals and amplifiers.

Hetfield's live rig in 2008 included:

 TC Electronic G-Major
 Line 6 DM4
 Mesa/Boogie Custom Graphic EQ
 MXR Phase 100
 ATI NanoAmp SUM 100
 Klon Centaur
 Boss NS-2 Noise Suppressor

 Voodoo Lab Ground Control Pro
 Voodoo Lab GCX Audio Switcher (x2)
 Voodoo Lab Pedal Power 2 Plus
 DBX 1074 Quad Gate
 Behringer Multigate Pro

In 2010, a Line 6 effects unit was added to the list, along with the TC Electronic unit, perhaps indicating that this had replaced his stompboxes.

Accessories 

 Ernie Ball Power Slinky strings (.11–.48)
 Dunlop James Hetfield Black Fang 1.14 mm picks
 3" Levy's Straps
 Peterson Strobe 420 Tuner
 EMG JH Het Set
 Shure UR-4D Wireless Equipment
 Furman AR Pro Power Conditioner

In addition, Hetfield uses Shure Super 55 microphones for vocals.

Discography

Metallica

 Kill 'Em All (1983)
 Ride the Lightning (1984)
 Master of Puppets (1986)
 ...And Justice for All (1988)
 Metallica (1991)
 Load (1996)
 ReLoad (1997)
 St. Anger (2003)
 Death Magnetic (2008)
 Hardwired... to Self-Destruct (2016)
 72 Seasons (2023)

Filmography

Guest appearances

On stage 
 Hetfield sang "Baby Hold On" at the Eddie Money Tribute Concert on February 23, 2020, in Beverly Hills.
 Hetfield sang "Stone Cold Crazy" at the Freddie Mercury Tribute Concert, accompanied by the remaining members of Queen and Tony Iommi on rhythm guitar.
 He performed at the Outlaws Concert in 2004, alongside Hank Williams Jr., Cowboy Troy, Big & Rich, Gretchen Wilson, and Kid Rock. Hetfield played one of close friend Waylon Jennings's songs, "Don't You Think This Outlaw Bit's Done Got Out of Hand", the very same he recorded on the tribute album to Jennings, I've Always Been Crazy. At this same event, he performed Metallica's "Mama Said" with Jesse Colter, the widow of Waylon Jennings, though this was cut from the television broadcast.
 Hetfield appeared onstage with Alice in Chains on June 2, 2006, at Rock am Ring, singing deceased vocalist Layne Staley's parts on the song "Would?". He again appeared with Alice in Chains to perform "Would?" when they played at The Warfield in San Francisco on November 26, 2006.
 On November 17, 2000, Hetfield was at a Misfits concert accompanied by his body guard at Maritime Hall in San Francisco, where he eventually got up on the stage and sang "Last Caress", then "Die, Die My Darling" whilst being accompanied by the band.

Musical collaborations 
 He provided backing vocals on "Man or Ash" on the Corrosion of Conformity album Wiseblood.
 He sang backing vocals on "Twist of Cain" and "Possession" on Danzig's debut album Danzig.
 He played guitar on "Eclectic Electric" from the Primus album Antipop.
 He performed guest vocals on "Drivin' Rain" on the Gov't Mule album The Deep End, Volume 2 and on the soundtrack NASCAR on Fox: Crank It Up (2002).
 Hetfield performed guest vocals on the Heart song "Beautiful Broken" from their album of the same name which was released on July 8, 2016.

Film 
 Though previously believed to have been sung by Trey Parker, the song "Hell Isn't Good" from the film South Park: Bigger, Longer and Uncut was actually sung by Hetfield. He admitted to doing so in 2000, confirming what many Hetfield fans had already recognized as his trademark growling style.
 Hetfield appeared as Officer Bob Hayward in the 2019 Ted Bundy biopic Extremely Wicked, Shockingly Evil and Vile.

Television 
 Hetfield, as well as Metallica's lead guitarist Kirk Hammett, voiced characters in a number of episodes of the Adult Swim cartoon Metalocalypse.
 Hetfield, along with Metallica drummer Lars Ulrich, voiced a pair of teenage dragons in an episode of Disney's Dave the Barbarian, entitled "Here There Be Dragons".
 He also appeared as a guest in an episode of Space Ghost Coast to Coast entitled "Jacksonville" alongside Hammett.
 Hetfield, along with the current Metallica lineup, appeared on an episode of Discovery's Time Warp, titled Metallica.
 Hetfield appeared on an episode of the MTV show Celebrity Deathmatch, in which he killed Limp Bizkit vocalist Fred Durst, but he and referee Mills Lane disappeared after Mankind jumped from the top of the roof and onto the ring and then it collapsed.
 Hetfield and Metallica also appeared in an episode of The Simpsons, "The Mook, the Chef, the Wife and Her Homer".
 Hetfield and filmmaker Justin Hunt were interviewed about the documentary Absent, which was directed by Hunt and features Hetfield and takes a look at the effects of absent fathers on their children, on Fox News Channel's Fox and Friends program on March 30, 2011.
 On February 1, 2016, Hetfield appeared in the American Dad! episode "The Life Aquatic with Steve Smith" as a water polo coach, constantly denying that he was The James Hetfield.
 In 2017, Hetfield narrated the documentary "Addicted to Porn".
 Hetfield is the voice of Wolfgang from the animated Skylanders Academy series.

Music videos 
 A photo of Hetfield appeared on Rammstein's music video "Haifisch".

Video games 
 Hetfield is a playable character in Tony Hawk's Pro Skater HD.

References

External links 

 
 
 
 NPR Interview With Metallica Guitarist and Vocalist James Hetfield (2004, audio)
 

1963 births
20th-century American male singers
20th-century American singers
21st-century American male singers
21st-century American singers
American baritones
American beekeepers
American heavy metal guitarists
American heavy metal singers
American male singer-songwriters
American people of English descent
American people of German descent
American people of Irish descent
American people of Scottish descent
American rock songwriters
American skateboarders
Critics of Christian Science
Former Christian Scientists
Living people
Metallica members
Musicians from Downey, California
People from Brea, California
Rhythm guitarists
Singer-songwriters from California
American hunters
American fishers
Thrash metal musicians
Guitarists from California
American male guitarists
20th-century American guitarists
21st-century American guitarists
Burn survivors